is a Japanese photographer. She came to prominence during the Zenkyoto student movement in the late 1960s, participating in the 1970 Anpo protests against the renewal of the Japan-US Mutual Security Treaty. When the treaty was renewed in 1970, Watanabe began drinking fairly heavily as a way to deal with their failure to prevent it.  Her photographs depict speeches, state violence and the aftermath of rioting.

References

Nihon shashinka jiten / 328 Outstanding Japanese Photographers. Kyoto: Tankōsha, 2000. .  Despite the English-language alternative title, all in Japanese.

Japanese photographers
1939 births
Living people
Place of birth missing (living people)